A chronological listing of songs produced by The Cataracs.

2010 
 Snoop Dogg - "Wet" (Doggumentary)
 Far East Movement - "Like a G6" (Free Wired)
 New Boyz - "Backseat" (Too Cool to Care)
 Hyper Crush - "Kick Us Out"
 Dev - "Fireball"
 Dev - "Booty Bounce"  (Is Hot: The Mixtape)
 Glasses Malone - "I Get Doe" (Beach Cruiser)
 The Pack - Wolfpack Party
 "Wolfpack Party"
 "Sex on the Beach"
 "Aye!"
 "Booty Bounce"

2011 
 Dev - The Night the Sun Came Up
 "Getaway"
 "Kiss My Lips"
 "Me"
 "Breathe"
 "Lightspeed"
 "Shadows"
 "Perfect Match"
 "In My Trunk"
 "Take Her From You"
 "Dancing Shoes"
 "Bass Down Low"
 "In The Dark"
 "Killer"
 Shwayze - "Love Letter" (Love Stoned)
 New Boyz - "Better with the Lights Off" (Too Cool to Care)
 50 Cent - "I'm On It"
 Mistah F.A.B. - "City Nights"
 Dev & Enrique Iglesias - "Naked"
The Cataracs - "Top of the World" (featuring Dev)

2012 

 The Cataracs - "All You" (featuring Waka Flocka Flame and Kaskade)

2013 
 Selena Gomez - Stars Dance
 "Slow Down"
 "Undercover"
 Sean Paul - "Other Side of Love"
 Enrique Iglesias - "Turn the Night Up"
 Robin Thicke - Blurred Lines
 "Pressure"
 "Put Your Lovin' on Me"

 The Cataracs -"Hey Now" (with Martin Solveig featuring Kyle)

Discographies of American artists
Production discographies
Hip hop discographies